Francis V may refer to:

 Francis V of Beauharnais (1714–1800)
 Francis V, Duke of Modena (1819–1875)